Lanfeust Quest is a French comics series version of the adventures of Lanfeust. Written in Japanese reading direction, small format, black and white and a lot more distinctive style, this revised version of Lanfeust of Troy is illustrated by Ludo Lullabi.

Characters 
 Lanfeust: Very dissatisfied with his ability to be able to melt metal, Lanfeust dreams of being a hero. One day in contact with some ivory sword pommel, he discovered an absolute power. To him the great adventure!
 C'ian: Nicolède's elder daughter, but primarily girlfriend Lanfeust. Lovingly, she acquires after dark, the power of healing.
 Cixi: Nicolède's younger daughter. She can transform water into ice or steam, and did not deny to play tricks on you!
 Nicolède: The village elder of Glinin. He will guide Lanfeust, that scholars of Eckmül can study at leisure.
 Hébus: Wild. Brutal. Ruthless. Carnivorous. In short, a troll, what! The perfect companion ... when he is not trying to eat you!
 The Knight Or-Azur: Coming of the Baron, he has the sword that gives Lanfeust his absolute power. Pretentious Knight crosses paths with our heroes repeatedly ...

Tomes

Volume 1 

Released in December 2007
 Chapter 01: Trolle meeting
 Chapter 02: A wonderful gift
 Chapter 03: The King of the forge
 Chapter 04: Cixi devil
 Chapter 05: A disarmed knight
 Chapter 06: The Power of Lanfeust
 Chapter 07: The wisdom of Nicolède
 Chapter 08: The great departure
 Chapter 09: The Last Stand

Volume 2 

Released in June 2008
 Chapter 10: Troll hit
 Chapter 11: Traps
 Chapter 12: It will hurt!
 Chapter 13: Spider Villain
 Chapter 14: Mind-blowing
 Chapter 15: Wet to death
 Chapter 16: Jaclare here we are!
 Chapter 17: It was not included
 Chapter 18: Should I stay or should I go?

Volume 3 

Released in January 2009
 Chapter 19: Battle in the sun
 Chapter 20: Teamwork
 Chapter 21: The animal rights
 Chapter 22: Nicolède decides
 Chapter 23: A day too
 Chapter 24: Dawn and the dust
 Chapter 25: The head against attack
 Chapter 26: Dark Troll
 Chapter 27: The plan Torll

Volume 4 

Released in July 2009
 Chapter 28: Trolls trolls versus
 Chapter 29: Village cardboard
 Chapter 30: Tartar Fazou
 Chapter 31: Fight Heads
 Chapter 32: The Fall of Heroes
 Chapter 33: The Breath of Magohamoth
 Chapter 34: Tornado metal
 Chapter 35: The big face to face

Volume 5 

Released in January 2010
 Chapter 36: A rude awakening
 Chapter 37: The son of the wind
 Chapter 38: Troll delighted
 Chapter 39: The high seas
 Chapter 40: Deep Sea Fishing
 Chapter 41: Cixi and frozen octopus
 Chapter 42 squads Doriane
 Chapter 43: Eckmül

Review 
- "Intended for a wider market, this version only hang Humor is less present, the baddest and the presence hero 's Hébus is almost anecdotal Critics see it as a marketing release ....... changes to the specifics of the format make it a 'next' interesting for those who love this series / world which is well developed ...."

- "Lanfeust Quest is not a simple transposition of the Franco-Belgian series Lanfeust of Troy Manga. While the original frame remains but Arleston and Ludo Lullabi achieve perfect adaptation taking into account the specificities of support ...."

- "... Definitely adapting Lanfeust manga format is a success that we look forward to continuing to read."

- "... The authors now seem to have finished their moult transition to manga, adapting happily to the codes of shounen, that fits the character of Lanfeust and his little band ...."

- "... It must be said, the designs are superb Ludo Lullabi perfectly mastered his designs and the new character design is a success no box is sloppy and rendering is very dynamic ...."

Adaptation 
In 2011, it was revealed that Gaumont Animation was developing a 26-episode computer-animated television series based on the comics for M6. The following year, India's DQ Entertainment agreed to co-produce the show. Canal J joined as a broadcast partner that June. In France, M6 premiered the series September 25, 2013, followed by Canal J's broadcast on March 1, 2014, and sister channel Gulli on January 4, 2016.

Australia's ABC3 began airing an English version on July 11, 2014. That same month, Disney Channels Worldwide acquired the series for broadcast in Germany, Spain, Turkey, Italy, the Netherlands, Belgium, the Middle East and Africa. The show has also aired on Portugal's Biggs, Singapore's Okto and Spain's Clan.

Reception
On bdgest.com, M. Antoniutti gave volume 1 a grade of 4 out of 10.

See also

Related articles 
 Lanfeust of Troy
 Lanfeust Star
 Trolls of Troy
 Universe Troy

Notes 

French children's animated science fiction television series
Troy
Science fiction comedy
Science fiction comics
2000s French animated television series
2010s French animated television series
Comics adapted into animated series
Comics adapted into television series